Rich Men's Wives is a lost 1922 American silent drama film directed by Louis J. Gasnier and starring House Peters, Claire Windsor and Gaston Glass.

Synopsis
A bored wife of a wealthy man is irritated by his neglect, and is drawn into a flirtation with another man. When her husband discovers this he banishes this from the family home, and forbids her from seeing their son.

Cast
 House Peters as 	John Masters
 Claire Windsor as Gay Davenport
 Richard Headrick as 	Jackie
 Gaston Glass as Juan Camillo
 Charles Clary as Mr. Davenport
 Myrtle Stedman as Mrs. Davenport
 Mildred June as Estelle Davenport
 Rosemary Theby as Mrs. Lindley-Blair
 Carol Holloway as Maid
 Martha Mattox as Nurse
 William Austin as Reggie

References

Bibliography
 Connelly, Robert B. The Silents: Silent Feature Films, 1910-36, Volume 40, Issue 2. December Press, 1998.
 Munden, Kenneth White. The American Film Institute Catalog of Motion Pictures Produced in the United States, Part 1. University of California Press, 1997.

External links
 
 

1922 films
1922 drama films
1920s English-language films
American silent feature films
Silent American drama films
Films directed by Louis J. Gasnier
American black-and-white films
Preferred Pictures films
1920s American films